Chhatara may refer to:

Chhatara, Achham, Nepal
Chhatara, Bajura, Nepal